Polypoetes augustimacula is a moth of the family Notodontidae. It is found in Colombia.

It is one of the largest species in the genus Polypoetes. The female type, the only known specimen, has a forewing length of 22 mm.

References

Moths described in 1902
Notodontidae of South America